Kanpur Dehat district is a district in Uttar Pradesh state in northern India. The administrative headquarters of the district are at Mati-Akbarpur. This district is part of Kanpur division. Kanpur was formerly spelled Cawnpore.

History
The site of the Battle of Madarpur, fought between the Bhumihar zamindars and the Mughal Empire in 1528CE took place within the present-day Kanpur Dehat district.

Kanpur District was divided into two districts, namely Kanpur Nagar and Kanpur Dehat in year 1977. The two were reunited again in 1979 and again separated in 1981. Uttar Pradesh government decided to rename Kanpur Dehat district as Ramabai Nagar district on 1 July 2010. In July 2012, it was returned to Kanpur Dehat.

Tehsils in Kanpur Dehat district
Akbarpur
Bhognipur
Derapur
Rasulabad
Sikandara
Maitha

Political representatives

Legislative Council

Legislative Assembly

Parliamentary constituencies

Transport 
The district is well connected by railways. Three rail tracks run through Kanpur Dehat district. The railway route connecting Delhi to Hawrah belonging to North Central zone of Indian Railways is passing through centre of the district. This railway track is broad gauge and fully electrified. The railway stations on this route through the district are Bhaupur, Maitha, Roshan Mau Halt, Rura, Ambiyapur, Jhinjhak and Parjani Halt. Rura Railway Station is the main railway Station of Kanpur Dehat District.

The second track is Kanpur to Jhansi railway line. The railway stations on this route are Binaur, Rasulpur Gogumau, Tilaunchi, Paman, Lalpur, Malasa, Pukhrayan and Chaunrah. This broad gauge railway track is electrified also belongs to North Central zone.

The third railway line converted to broad gauge belongs to North Eastern Railway zone. The track runs parallel to the Ganges river. This track is also electrified.

Notable residents

Ram Nath Kovind, former governor of Bihar and former President of India

Poets
Asharfi Lal Mishra  is a Hindi poet. He wrote a poetry named " Lal Shatak (Dohe)" having 100 Dohe. This poetry is published in Amarujala.com in two parts. Many free poems also published in Amarujala.com. He is a Poet, author and blogger too. His poetry named Kavy sangrah is published in Navbharat  Times.com

Notable places

Historical
Shukla Talab (Akbarpur) was built by Sheetal Shukla, Deewan of Emperor Akbar.

Religious

Waneshwar Mahadev Temple:Banipara
Kapaleshwar Temple:Derapur
Parhul Devi Temple:near Rura
Mukta Devi Temple:near Musanagar
Katyani Devi (Kathari Devi) Temple: 6 km towards south of village Shahjahanpur in uneven land
Durvasa Rishi Ashram: In near village NIGOHI Bank of segur river
Jageshwar Temple:Shivli
Dharma Garh Baba Temple:Rasulabad, Kanpur Dehat

Villages
 

Dharau

Educational institutions
 RSGU Post Graduate College Pukhrayan
Akbarpur Degree College Akbarpur Kanpur Dehat
Govt.Degree College, Akbarpur, Kanpur Dehat 
R P S Inter College, Rura
Akbarpur Inter College Akbarpur
Kendriya Vidyalaya, Mati
Jawahar Navodaya Vidyalaya Kanpur Dehat
Galuapur Inter College Galuapur
Patel Vidyapeeth Inter College Baraur
Gram Vikas Inter College Budhauli
C.D.Girls Inter College Rura
Akbarpur Girls Inter College Akbarpur
Shri Ram Janki Sanskrit Mahavidyalaya  Gauriyapur
Pt.Triyugi Narayan Mahavidyalaya Mangalpur
 Malviya Inter College mungisapur Kanpur dehat

Demographics

According to the 2011 census Kanpur Dehat district has a population of 1,795,092, roughly equal to the nation of The Gambia or the US state of Nebraska. This gives it a ranking of 268th in India (out of a total of 640 districts). 
Its population growth rate over the decade 2001-2011 was 14.82%. Kanpur Dehat has a sex ratio of 862 females for every 1000 males, and a literacy rate of 77.52%. Scheduled Castes made up 25.66% of the population.

At the time of the 2011 Census of India, 98.97% of the population in the district spoke Hindi (or a related language) and 0.94% Urdu as their first language.

Kos Minars
Since the Mughal Road passes through Kanpur Dehat district, there are many Kos Minar (mile pillars) in the district. Some of them are protected monuments, notable ones are at Bhognipur, Chapar Ghata, Deosar, Gaur, Halia, Jallapur Sikandara, Pailwaru, Pitampur, Raigawan, Rajpur, Sankhiln Buzurg, Sardarpur.

International airport proposal

An international airport named Rasoolabad International Airport was proposed in 2015 to be constructed in Kanpur Dehat district about 50 km from Kanpur. The airport will serve the region from Agra division, Jhansi division, Kanpur division, Aligarh division, Allahabad division, Banda division and Lucknow division. It would have direct link road with Agra Lucknow Expressway.

References

 
Districts of Uttar Pradesh
1981 establishments in Uttar Pradesh